"Peace" (also known as "Peace (In the Valley)") is a song by American singer Sabrina Johnston, originally released in the US on JBR Records in May 1991. It was released as the first single from her debut studio album, Peace (1992). The single reached number eight on the UK Singles Chart and entered the top 30 in Australia, Ireland, Italy and Sweden. It was written and produced by Johnston with help from her husband Ken Johnston. She told in a 1991 interview, that she wrote the song during the Gulf War. "I wanted to create something positive", she said. In 1992, Johnston appeared on the Red Hot Organization's dance compilation album, Red Hot + Dance, contributing a new remix of "Peace", the Nu-Mix, to raise awareness and money in support of the AIDS epidemic. 

The song caught the attention of English rock band The Rolling Stones, who asked her to audition for their tour. However, they lost out to JBR Records and EastWest when she was signed for her second album. New remixes of the track were released in 2009.

Composition
"Peace" is composed in the key of A Major at a tempo of 121 beats per minute.

Chart performance
"Peace" was a notable hit in both Europe and Australia. The song entered the top 10 in the UK, peaking at number eight on September 22, 1991, in its fourth week on the UK Singles Chart. It held that position for two weeks, before dropping to number ten and then leaving the UK Top 10. On the UK year-end chart, the song ended up as number 61. On the UK Dance Singles Chart, "Peace" reached number five. It entered the top 20 in Ireland (14) and Italy (19), as well as on the Eurochart Hot  100, where it peaked at number 15 in October 1991. On the European Dance Radio Chart, the song peaked at number 4 in November same year. Outside Europe, it charted in Australia, peaking at number 24 in March 1992. "Peace" stayed within the Australian Top 50 for a total of eight weeks.

Critical reception
Larry Flick from Billboard wrote, "Not since Crystal Waters set clubland on fire a couple months ago with "Gypsy Woman" have we heard anything as exciting as "Peace" by Sabrina Johnston", adding that the singer "delivers uplifting lyrics with the power and style of a young Aretha Franklin. She is supported by a feast of lush string-like synths, a rousing bass line, and mixable percussion breaks." In 1992, Flick named it "one of 1991's brightest moments." British Crawley News described it as "singalong hallelujah stuff". Dave Sholin from the Gavin Report remarked that a "gospel influence pours out of this sizzlin' production by a new vocal talent from the East Coast whose previous experience has been as a studio singer. Talk about an eye opener—this is one made to infuse excitement onto the airwaves." 

A reviewer from Music & Media noted that originally released by the US-based JBR label, this European remix by British electronic music group Brothers In Rhythm (Steve Anderson/David Seaman) "lifts the garage groove to powerful and energetic heights." James Hamilton from Music Week called it a "gospel-ish repetitive garage lurcher". Andy Beevers from the RM Dance Update felt that the song "could become a disco classic", constating that the producers "have given it a piano, strings and organ-driven sound that is every bit as wild, energetic, glorious and uplifting as the vocals."

Music video
The accompanying music video for "Peace" was directed by British director Richard Heslop.

Track listings

 7-inch single, Germany (1991)   
"Peace" (Brothers In Rhythm Edit) — 4:02
"Peace" (In The Valley Mix) — 3:52

 CD single, Europe (1991)
"Peace" (Brothers In Rhythm Mix) — 6:52
"Peace" (Original Stomp Mix) — 7:12
"Peace" (Dub Mix) — 5:04

 CD maxi, Europe (1991)   
"Peace" (Brothers In Rhythm Edit)
"Peace" (Brothers In Rhythm)
"Peace" (Original Stomp Mix)

 CD (remixes), Italy (2009)
"Peace" (Midnight Express Classic Gold Mix) — 10:13
"Peace" (Denzal Park Mix) — 6:25
"Peace" (Midnight Express Power Mix) — 8:06
"Peace" (Midnight Express New Retro Mix) — 7:33
"Peace" (Jerome Farley Floor One 2009 Club Remix) — 7:31
"Peace" (Jerome Farley Floor One 2009 Dub) — 5:23
"Peace" (Midnight Express Rock Da House Mix) — 7:36
"Peace" (Luca Belladonna Remix) — 6:53
"Peace" (Original Edit Version) — 4:05
"Peace" (Power Original Mix) — 8:06

Charts

Weekly charts

Year-end charts

References

1991 debut singles
1991 songs
Anti-war songs
Peace songs
East West Records singles
Electronic songs
House music songs
Music videos directed by Richard Heslop